Sonya Aoun Beiruty is a Lebanese journalist and writer who has written for several newspapers and magazines in Lebanon. Her books include The Mills of Sectarianism, about sectarianism as a direct cause of the Lebanese civil war, and the novel The Cords of Air, about the lives of 24 Lebanese women.

Early life and education 
Beiruty was born in Achrafieh. Her first marriage, to Bicharah Beiruty, ended in divorce and she later married Ihsan Chatilla.

Career 
Beiruty began writing journalism for Assayad magazine. In the 1960s she hosted a Lebanese TV talk show.

She was editor-in-chief of Al-Hasnnaa magazine before returning to Assayad and writing for Al-Anwar newspaper in the 1970s.

In the early 1980s she began working for Fayrouz news magazine.

Works 
Her works include:

 The Mills of Sectarianism
 The Cords of Air
 Dates with Yesterday
 The Orbit of the Moment.

References 

Lebanese writers
Lebanese journalists